C. sinica  may refer to:
 Caenorhabditis sinica, a nematode species
 Caragana sinica, a plant species
 Carduelis sinica, the Oriental Greenfinch or Grey-capped Greenfinch, a small passerine bird species